The Royal Commission for Makkah City and Holy Sites is a Saudi commission that was established on 2 June 2018 by a royal decree issued by Saudi Arabia’s King Salman. The Commission is responsible for the improvement of services as well as the establishment of a sustainable system at the Grand Mosque in Makkah and the holy sites.

Board of directors 
A board of directors governs the commission under the chairmanship of the Vice President of the Council of Ministers and membership appointed by the Prime Minister of the Council of Ministers. The members of the commission are:

References 



Government agencies of Saudi Arabia
2018 establishments in Saudi Arabia